A list of animated television series first aired in 1985.

See also
 List of animated feature films of 1985
 List of Japanese animation television series of 1985

References

Television series
Animated series
1985
1985
1985-related lists